Augustus Nicodemus Gomes Lopes, born in Paraíba, Brazil, is a Presbyterian minister, Calvinist theologian, writer and professor. He was Chancellor of Mackenzie Presbyterian University from 2003 to 2013. He is one of the greatest Brazilian conservative theologians. He is married to Minka Lopes and has four children.

His line of interpretation follows the grammatical-historical method as opposed to the historical-critical interpretation. He believes that the divine revelation through spiritual gifts and prophecy has ended, and does not believe in manifestation of tongues as a sign of the Holy Spirit's activities in modern days. He also discusses practical issues such as family, missions, holiness, being filled with the Spirit, worship, and spiritual warfare.

Theological and ministerial
He graduated in theology at the Seminário Presbiteriano do Norte (North Presbyterian Seminary) in Recife, holds a master's degree in New Testament by the Reformed University of Potchefstroom (South Africa) and a doctorate in Biblical Interpretation by Westminster Theological Seminary (USA), with studies at Reformed Seminary in Kampen (Netherlands). He has also done post doctoral studies at Westminster Theological Seminary. He was professor and director of the Seminário Presbiteriano do Norte (Northern Presbyterian Seminary) (1985–1991) in northern Brazil, professor of exegesis at Seminário José Manuel da Conceição (JMC Seminary) in São Paulo, New Testament Professor at the Centro Presbiteriano de Pós-Graduação Andrew Jumper (Andrew Jumper Presbyterian Post-Graduate Center) (1995–2001) in São Paulo, pastor of First Presbyterian Church of Recife (1989–1991) and pastor of the Evangelical Swiss Church of São Paulo (1995–2001). He was associate pastor of the Presbyterian Church of Santo Amaro, São Paulo, SP until 2014. He was senior pastor of First Presbyterian Church of Goiania (2014 to 2018). He is assistant pastor of the First Presbyterian Church of Recife since 2018.

Books
 Cristianismo simplificado: Respostas diretas a dúvidas comuns (Mundo Cristão)
 Cristianismo descomplicado: Questões difíceis da vida cristã de um jeito fácil de entender (Mundo Cristão)
 Livres em Cristo: A Mensagem de Gálatas (Free in Christ: The Message of Galatians) (Vida Nova)
 Polêmicas na Igreja (Controversy in the Church) (Mundo Cristão)
 Apóstolos: A Verdade sobre o Apostolado (Apostles: The Truth About Apostleship) (Editora Fiel)
 O Culto segundo Deus—a mensagem de Malaquias (Worship according to God—the message of Malachi) (Vida Nova)
 A Supremacia e a Suficiência de Cristo—a mensagem de Colossenses (The Supremacy and Sufficiency of Christ—the message of Colossians) (Vida Nova)
 O Ateismo Cristão e outras ameaças à Igreja (Christian Atheism and Other Threats to the Church) (Mundo Cristão)
 O Que Estão Fazendo com a Igreja (What they are doing with the Church) (Mundo Cristão)
 Uma Igreja Complicada—Análise de 1Coríntios 1–4 (A Complicated Church—Analysis of 1Cor 1–4) (Cultura Cristã)
 O Que Você Precisa Saber Sobre Batalha Espiritual (What You Need to Know About Spiritual Warfare) (Cultura Cristã)
 O Que Você Precisa Saber sobre Culto Espiritual (What You Need to Know About Spiritual Worship) (Cultura Cristã)
 A Bíblia e Sua Família (The Bible and Your Family) (Cultura Cristã)
 A Bíblia e Seus Intérpretes (The Bible and Its Interpreters) (Cultura Cristã)
 Fé Cristã e Misticismo (Christian Faith and Mysticism) co-author (Cultura Cristã)
 Tolerância no Novo Testamento (Tolerance in the New Testament) (PES)
 Calvino, o Teólogo do Espírito Santo (Calvin, the Theologian of the Holy Spirit) (PES)
 Calvino e a Responsabilidade Social da Igreja (Calvin and the Social Responsibility of the Church) (PES)
 Ordenação de Mulheres: O que diz o Novo Testamento (Ordination of Women: What the New Testament Says) (PES)
 Comentário em 1 João (Commentary on 1 John) (Cultura Cristã)
 Comentário em Tiago (Commentary on James) (Cultura Cristã)
 Comentário em 2 e 3 João e Judas (Commentary on 2 and 3 John and Jude) (Cultura Cristã)
 Cheios do Espírito (Filled with the Spirit) (Vida)
 Ainda Não é o Fim (It's Not the End Yet) (LPC)
 A Visão Social de Calvino (Calvin's Social Vision) (Cultura Cristã)

References 

Brazilian Christian theologians
Living people
Calvinist and Reformed ministers
Presbyterian ministers
Brazilian Presbyterians
People from Paraíba
Year of birth missing (living people)
Academic staff of Mackenzie Presbyterian University